Gilberto Clavell III (born August 10, 1989) is a Puerto Rican professional basketball player who currently plays for Cangrejeros de Santurce of the Baloncesto Superior Nacional (BSN). Clavell was an All-American college player at Sam Houston State University. Clavell represents the Puerto Rico national basketball team and the Puerto Rico 3x3 men's national team at the international level.

College career
Clavell, a 6'6" small forward who prepped at Florida Air Academy, played two years at Collin County Community College in Texas. He then moved to Sam Houston State, where he scored over 1,000 points in only two years (1,166). As a junior in 2009–10, Clavell averaged 17 points per game and was named Southland Conference Newcomer of the Year and a second team All-Conference pick. As a senior, Clavell averaged 19.4 points per game on 55.9 percent shooting and grabbed 7.3 rebounds per game on his way to Southland Player of the Year honors and an Associated Press honorable mention All-American designation.

Professional career
Following the completion of his college career, Clavell signed with Maratonistas de Coamo of Puerto Rico's top league. In 2012, he signed with Kouvot of Finland's Korisliiga. In October 2013, Clavell signed with Hapoel Migdal Ha'emek in Israel, and in 2015 he moved to another Israeli team, Hapoel Afula.

Personal life
Clavell's brother Gian is also a professional basketball player who previously played for the Dallas Mavericks, as well as played college basketball at Colorado State.

References

External links 
Finnish League profile
BSN profile
Latinbasket.com profile

1989 births
Living people
Baloncesto Superior Nacional players
Basketball players at the 2015 Pan American Games
Basketball players at the 2019 Pan American Games
Pan American Games 3x3 basketball players
Caciques de Humacao players
Central American and Caribbean Games gold medalists for Puerto Rico
Central American and Caribbean Games medalists in basketball
Competitors at the 2018 Central American and Caribbean Games
Hapoel Afula players
Hapoel Migdal HaEmek B.C. players
Junior college men's basketball players in the United States
Kouvot players
Medalists at the 2019 Pan American Games
Maratonistas de Coamo players
Pan American Games medalists in basketball
Pan American Games silver medalists for Puerto Rico
People from Mayagüez, Puerto Rico
Puerto Rican expatriate basketball people in Finland
Puerto Rican expatriate basketball people in Israel
Puerto Rican men's basketball players
Sam Houston Bearkats men's basketball players
Santeros de Aguada basketball players
Small forwards